Flavio Scala (born 1 April 1945) is an Italian former yacht racer who competed in the 1972 Summer Olympics.

References

1945 births
Living people
Italian male sailors (sport)
Olympic sailors of Italy
Sailors at the 1972 Summer Olympics – Star
1987 America's Cup sailors